Butler B'ynote' (born September 29, 1972) is a former professional American football running back in the National Football League. He played college football at Ohio State University, and professionally for the Denver Broncos, Carolina Panthers, Barcelona Dragons, Orlando Predators, New York/New Jersey Hitmen and Colorado Crush. He ran on Ohio State's 4 × 400 metres relay team that set an NCAA record. During his playing career, he went by the spelling By'not'e because Ohio State misspelled it and he never corrected it.

B'ynote' worked at Madison Christian School in Groveport, Ohio as a computer teacher. He also served as on-air talent for the Big Ten Network football broadcasts in 2007. B'ynote' coached track at Centennial High School. B'ynote' first became a head football coach in 2012 at Briggs High School (Columbus, Ohio). In two years, Briggs went 2–18. B'ynote' taught and coached track at Sumner High School in St. Louis. B'ynote' also served as head football coach at his alma mater, Vashon High School from 2017 to 2018, compiling a 5–16 record. B'ynote' was replaced by another Vashon alum, Will Franklin. B'ynote' is an ordained reverend in the African Methodist Episcopal Zion Church and started a ministry, Nu Nazion.

B'ynote' is currently the head coach  for Westminster Christian Academy (Missouri) in Town & Country, Missouri.

References

External links
 Just Sports Stats

1972 births
Living people
American football defensive backs
American football running backs
Barcelona Dragons players
Carolina Panthers players
Colorado Crush players
Denver Broncos players
New York/New Jersey Hitmen players
Ohio State Buckeyes football players
Ohio State Buckeyes men's track and field athletes
Orlando Predators players
Players of American football from St. Louis
Track and field athletes from St. Louis
African-American players of American football
African-American male track and field athletes
21st-century African-American sportspeople
20th-century African-American sportspeople